Audra State Park is a West Virginia state park located on  in southwestern Barbour County. It was established around the remnants of an early 19th-century gristmill  and the tiny community of Audra. A gristmill spillway is still visible in the river. 

The park is a hilly, secondary forest area bisected by the Middle Fork River. The deep pools, large, flat rocks, and riverside beach have provided generations of campers, local teens and college students a place to swim or work on their tans. Audra State Park is the site of Alum Cave, which is accessible by a boardwalk built along this overhanging sandstone ledge.

The park serves as the put-in point for a 6.6 mile kayak run along about 2.8 miles the Middle Fork River and about 3.8 miles of the Tygart Valley River to the confluence of the latter with the Buckhannon River.

Features
 67 camp sites
 Swimming in the Middle Fork River
 Hiking trails
 Kayaking in the Middle Fork River
 Picnic area

Accessibility

Accessibility for the disabled was assessed by West Virginia University. The assessment found the campground, picnic area, and park offices to be accessible. The main swimming hole (just below the site of the former gristmill), with wet, slippery rocks and unpaved approaches is not considered accessible.

See also

List of West Virginia state parks

References

External links

State parks of West Virginia
Protected areas of Barbour County, West Virginia
Protected areas established in 1950
Campgrounds in West Virginia
1950 establishments in West Virginia
IUCN Category III